Wilton Lewis Felder (August 31, 1940 – September 27, 2015) was an American saxophone and bass player, and is best known as a founding member of the Jazz Crusaders, later known as The Crusaders. Felder played bass on the Jackson 5's hits "I Want You Back" and "ABC" and on Marvin Gaye's "Let's Get It On".

Biography
Felder was born on August 31, 1940, in Houston, Texas and studied music at Texas Southern University. Felder, Wayne Henderson, Joe Sample, and Stix Hooper founded their group while in high school in Houston. The Jazz Crusaders evolved from a straight-ahead jazz combo into a pioneering jazz-rock fusion group, with a definite soul music influence. Felder worked with the original group for over thirty years, and continued to work in its later versions, which often featured other founding members.

Felder also worked as a West Coast studio musician, mostly playing electric bass, for various soul and R&B musicians, and was one of the in-house bass players for Motown Records, when the record label opened operations in Los Angeles in the early 1970s. He played on recordings by the Jackson 5 such as "I Want You Back", "ABC" and "The Love You Save", as well as recordings by Marvin Gaye including "Let's Get It On" and "I Want You". He also played bass for soft rock groups like Seals and Crofts. Also of note were his contributions to the John Cale album Paris 1919, Steely Dan's Pretzel Logic (1974), and Billy Joel's Piano Man and Streetlife Serenade albums. He was one of three bass players on Randy Newman's Sail Away (1972) and Joan Baez' Diamonds & Rust. Felder also anchored albums from Grant Green, Joni Mitchell and Michael Franks.

His album Secrets, which prominently featured Bobby Womack on vocals, reached No. 77 in the UK Albums Chart in 1985. The album featured the minor hit, "(No Matter How High I Get) I'll Still be Looking Up to You", sung by Womack and Alltrinna Grayson.

Felder played a King Super 20 tenor sax with a metal 105/0 Berg Larsen mouthpiece. He also used Yamaha saxes. He played a Fender Telecaster Bass, and also played Aria bass guitars.

Felder died in 2015 at his home in Whittier, California from multiple myeloma. He was 75.

Discography

As leader/co-leader
 Bullitt (Pacific Jazz, 1969)
 We All Have a Star  (MCA, 1978)
 Inherit the Wind  (MCA, 1980)
 Gentle Fire (MCA, 1983)
 Secrets (MCA, 1985)
 Love Is a Rush (MCA, 1987)
 Nocturnal Moods (PAR, 1991)
 Forever, Always  (PAR, 1992)
 Lets Spend Some Time (BCS, 2005)

With The (Jazz) Crusaders
 Freedom Sound (Pacific Jazz, 1961)
 Lookin' Ahead (Pacific Jazz, 1962)
 The Jazz Crusaders at the Lighthouse (Pacific Jazz, 1962)
 Tough Talk (Pacific Jazz, 1963)
 Heat Wave (Pacific Jazz, 1963)
Jazz Waltz (Pacific Jazz, 1963) with Les McCann
 Stretchin' Out (Pacific Jazz, 1964)
 The Thing (Pacific Jazz, 1965)
 Chile Con Soul (Pacific Jazz, 1965)
 Live at the Lighthouse '66 (Pacific Jazz, 1966)
 Talk That Talk (Pacific Jazz, 1966)
 The Festival Album (Pacific Jazz, 1966)
 Uh Huh (Pacific Jazz, 1967)
 Lighthouse '68 (Pacific Jazz, 1968)
 Powerhouse (Pacific Jazz, 1969)
 Lighthouse '69 (Pacific Jazz, 1969)

As sideman
With Donald Byrd
 Ethiopian Knights (Blue Note, 1972)
With Joan Baez
 Diamonds & Rust (A&M, 1975)
 Blowin' Away (Portrait, 1977)
With John Cale
 Paris 1919 (Reprise, 1972)
With Michael Franks
 The Art of Tea (Reprise, 1976)
 Sleeping Gypsy (Warner Bros., 1977)With Dizzy Gillespie Free Ride (Pablo, 1977) composed and arranged by Lalo SchifrinWith Grant Green Shades of Green (Blue Note, 1971)
 Live at The Lighthouse (Blue Note, 1972)With Richard "Groove" Holmes Welcome Home (Pacific Jazz, 1968)With Harry Nilsson Flash Harry (Mercury, 1980)With Marvin Gaye Let's Get It On (Tamla, 1973)
 I Want You (Motown, 1976)With Matraca Berg The Speed of Grace (MCA, 1994)With Paul Anka The Painter (United Artists, 1976)With Solomon Burke Electronic Magnetism (MGM, 1971)With Donovan Slow Down World (Epic, 1976)
 Lady of the Stars (RCA, 1984)With Jackson Browne For Everyman (Asylum, 1973)With Jennifer Warnes Jennifer (Reprise, 1972)With Milt Jackson Memphis Jackson (Impulse!, 1969)With Tina Turner Private Dancer (Capitol, 1984)With John Klemmer Constant Throb (Impulse!, 1971)
 Waterfalls (Impulse!, 1972)
 Magic and Movement (Impulse!, 1974)With Charles Kynard Reelin' with the Feelin' (Prestige, 1969)With Minnie Riperton Stay in Love (Epic, 1977)With Ringo Starr Stop and Smell the Roses (RCA, 1981)With Carmen McRae Can't Hide Love (Blue Note, 1976)With Billy Joel Piano Man (Columbia, 1973)
 Streetlife Serenade (Columbia, 1974)With Randy Crawford Now We May Begin (Warner Bros., 1980)With Joni Mitchell For the Roses (Asylum, 1972)
 Court and Spark (Asylum, 1974)
 The Hissing of Summer Lawns (Asylum, 1975)With B.B. King Midnight Believer (ABC, 1978)
 Take It Home (ABC, 1979)With Wendy Waldman Love Has Got Me (Warner Bros., 1973)With Randy Newman Sail Away (Reprise, 1972)With Shuggie Otis Here Comes Shuggie Otis (Epic, 1970)
 Freedom Flight (Epic, 1971)With Dusty Springfield Cameo (ABC, 1973)With Jean-Luc Ponty King Kong: Jean-Luc Ponty Plays the Music of Frank Zappa (World Pacific/Liberty, 1970)With Seals & Crofts Summer Breeze (Warner Bros., 1972)
 Diamond Girl (Warner Bros., 1973)
 I'll Play for You (Warner Bros., 1975)
 Get Closer (Warner Bros., 1976)
 Sudan Village (Warner Bros., 1976)With Jimmy Smith Root Down (Verve, 1972)With Steely Dan Pretzel Logic (ABC, 1974)With Gerald Wilson California Soul (Pacific Jazz, 1968)With Hugh Masekela' Reconstruction'' (Chisa, 1970)

References

External links

Wilton Felder isolated bass parts on Jackson 5 hits

1940 births
2015 deaths
American rhythm and blues bass guitarists
American rock bass guitarists
American session musicians
American jazz bass guitarists
American male bass guitarists
American jazz saxophonists
American male saxophonists
Deaths from multiple myeloma
Deaths from cancer in California
Musicians from Houston
Soul-jazz musicians
Guitarists from Los Angeles
Guitarists from Texas
20th-century American bass guitarists
American male jazz musicians
The Crusaders members
20th-century American male musicians
The Love Unlimited Orchestra members
20th-century American saxophonists